Elephantine (Elephantíne;) is an island on the Nile, forming part of the city of Aswan in Upper Egypt. The archaeological sites on the island were inscribed on the UNESCO World Heritage List in 1979 along with other examples of Upper Egyptian architecture, as part of the "Nubian Monuments from Abu Simbel to Philae" (despite Elephantine being neither Nubian, nor between Abu Simbel and Philae).

Geography

The layout of this and other nearby islands in Aswan can be seen from west bank hillsides along the Nile. The island is located just downstream of the First Cataract, at the southern border of Upper Egypt with Lower Nubia. This region above is referred to as Upper Egypt because it is further up the Nile.

The island may have received its name after its shape, which in aerial views is similar to that of an elephant tusk, or from the rounded rocks along the banks resembling elephants.

Ancient Egypt
Known to the ancient Egyptians as ꜣbw "Elephant" (Middle Egyptian:  → Medio-Late Egyptian:  → Coptic: (Ⲉ)ⲓⲏⲃ , preserved in its Hebrew name, יֵב 'yev'), the island of Elephantine stood at the border between Egypt and Nubia. It was an excellent defensive site for a city and its location made it a natural cargo transfer point for river trade. This border is near the Tropic of Cancer, the most northerly latitude at which the sun can appear directly overhead at noon and from which it appears to reverse direction or "turn back" at the solstices.

Elephantine was a fort that stood just before the First Cataract of the Nile.  During the Second Intermediate Period (1650–1550 BC), the fort marked the southern border of Egypt.

Historical texts from the Middle Kingdom of Egypt mention the mother of Amenemhat I, founder of the Twelfth Dynasty, being from the Elephantine Egyptian nome Ta-Seti. Many scholars have argued that Amenemhat I's mother was of Nubian origin.

According to the ancient Egyptian religion, Elephantine was the dwelling place of Khnum, the ram-headed god of the cataracts, who guarded and controlled the waters of the Nile from caves beneath the island. He was worshipped here as part of a late triad of Egyptian deities. This "Elephantine Triad" included Satis and Anuket. Satis was worshipped from very early times as a war goddess and protector of this strategic region of Egypt. When seen as a fertility goddess, she personified the bountiful annual flooding of the Nile, which was identified as her daughter, Anuket.  The cult of Satis originated in the ancient city of Aswan. Later, when the triad was formed, Khnum became identified as her consort and, thereby, was thought of as the father of Anuket. His role in myths changed later and another deity was assigned his duties with the river. At that time his role as a potter enabled him to be assigned a duty in the creation of human bodies.

Archaeological sites
Ongoing excavations by the German Archaeological Institute at the town have uncovered many findings, on display in the Aswan Museum located on the island, including a mummified ram of Khnum. Artifacts dating back to prehistoric Egypt have been found on Elephantine. A rare calendar, known as the Elephantine Calendar of Things, which dates to the reign of Thutmose III during the Eighteenth Dynasty, was found in fragments on the island.

In ancient times the island was also an important stone quarry, providing granite for monuments and buildings all over Egypt.

Temples

Prior to 1822, there were temples to Thutmose III and Amenhotep III on the island. In 1822, they were destroyed during the campaign of Muhammad Ali, who had taken power in Egypt, to conquer Sudan. Both temples were relatively intact prior to the deliberate demolition.

The first temple was the Temple of Satet, it was founded around 3000 BC and enlarged and renovated over the next 3,000 years. There are records of an Egyptian temple to Khnum on the island as early as the Third Dynasty. This temple was completely rebuilt in the Late Period, during the Thirtieth Dynasty of Egypt, just before the foreign rule that followed in the Graeco-Roman Period. The Greeks formed the Ptolemaic dynasty during their three-hundred-year rule over Egypt (305–30 BC) and maintained the ancient religious customs and traditions, while often associating the Egyptian deities with their own.

Most of the present day southern tip of the island is taken up by the ruins of the Temple of Khnum. These, the oldest ruins still standing on the island, are composed of a granite step pyramid from the Third Dynasty and a small temple built for the local Sixth Dynasty nomarch, Heqaib. In the Middle Kingdom, many officials, such as the local governors Sarenput I or Heqaib III, dedicated statues and shrines into the temple.

Nilometers
A nilometer was a structure for measuring the Nile River's clarity and the water level during the annual flood season. There are two nilometers at Elephantine Island. The more famous is a corridor nilometer associated with the Temple of Satis, with a stone staircase that descends the corridor. It is one of the oldest nilometers in Egypt, last reconstructed in Roman times and still in use as late as the nineteenth century AD. Ninety steps that lead down to the river are marked with Arabic, Roman, and hieroglyphic numerals.  Visible at the water's edge are inscriptions carved deeply into the rock during the Seventeenth Dynasty.

The other Nilometer is a rectangular basin located at the island's southern tip, near the Temple of Khnum and opposite the Old Cataract Hotel. It is probably the older of the two. One of the nilometers, though it is not certain which, is mentioned by the Greek historian Strabo.

Many sources claim that the fabled "Well of Eratosthenes", famous in connection with Eratosthenes' presumed calculation of the Earth's circumference, was located on the island. Strabo mentions a well that was used to observe that Aswan lies on the Tropic of Cancer, but the reference is to a well at Aswan, not at Elephantine. Neither nilometer at Elephantine is suitable for the purpose, while the well at Aswan is apparently lost.

Jewish presence

The Elephantine papyri are caches of legal documents and letters written in Aramaic dating to sometime in the fifth century BC. These papyri document the presence of a community of Judean mercenaries and their families on Elephantine, starting in the seventh century BCE. The mercenaries guarded the frontier between Egypt and Nubia to the south. Following the Babylonian destruction of Jerusalem in the sixth century BCE, some Judean refugees traveled south and, in what may be called an “exodus in reverse,” settled on Elephantine. They maintained their own temple (the House of Yahweh), in which sacrifices were offered, evincing polytheistic beliefs, which functioned alongside that of Khnum. The temple was destroyed in 410 BC at the instigation of the priests of Khnum.

The temple may have been built in reaction to Manasseh's reinstitution of pagan worship or simply to serve the needs of the Jewish community.

Other features

The Aswan Museum is located at the southern end of the island. Ongoing excavations by the German Archaeological Institute at the island's ancient town site have uncovered many findings that are now on display in the museum, including a mummified ram of Khnum. A sizable population of Nubians live in three villages in the island's middle section. A large luxury hotel is at the island's northern end.

The Aswan Botanical Garden is adjacent to the west on el Nabatat Island.

Gallery

See also

Sehel Island
Temple of Satet

References

Further reading 
 

 
Aswan
Islands of the Nile
River islands of Egypt
Archaeological sites in Egypt
Historic Jewish communities in North Africa
Khnum